Airmail Pilot is a video game published in 1979 by Instant Software, in which the player pilots a Curtiss JN-4D "Jenny" biplane carrying mail from Columbus, Ohio to Chicago.

Gameplay

The game begins with an advertisement attributed to an 18 July 1922 issue of the Chicago Sun which reads: "Wanted: Airmail pilot for the Columbus to Chicago run. Must be willing to fly in every type of weather. Only the foolhardy need apply." The player pilots a Curtiss JN-4D "Jenny" biplane carrying mail from Columbus, Ohio to Chicago, via Dayton, Indianapolis, and Logansport.

Reception
Bruce Campbell reviewed Airmail Pilot in The Space Gamer No. 36. Campbell commented that "If you are looking for a realistic airflight simulation, Airmail Pilot is not for you. Since its price is on the lower end of the software spectrum, I do recommend it for those looking for a quick, easy, enjoyable game with limited staying power." Another reviewer from Moves commented, "It can be fun and amusing, but it is not designed to hold an adult's attention for very long."

References

External links
Review in Kilobaud Microcomputing
 Airmail Pilot at Video Game Geek

1979 video games
Flight simulation video games
Instant Software games
TI-99/4A games
TRS-80 games
Video games set in Chicago
Video games set in Indiana
Video games set in Indianapolis
Video games set in Ohio